The Cedars, also known as Cocke's Tavern and The Casino, is a historic home located near Greenwood, Albemarle County, Virginia. It was built about 1850–1860, and is a large, two-story, five-bay, hipped-roof brick house in the Greek Revival style. It has a full grade-level basement, paired gable end chimneys, and prominent front and back porches.  The front porch is two-stories and has a striking pediment.  Also on the property is a contributing kitchen / servants quarter.  The house has served as a residence, a boys' school, Civil War hospital, tanyard business and gambling casino, as well as (possibly) a tavern.  It is considered one of the most architecturally distinguished antebellum houses in western Albemarle County.

There have been some claims of ghost sightings and haunted activities on the property.

It was added to the National Register of Historic Places in 1990.

References

Houses on the National Register of Historic Places in Virginia
Greek Revival houses in Virginia
Houses completed in 1855
Houses in Albemarle County, Virginia
National Register of Historic Places in Albemarle County, Virginia
U.S. Route 250